Porisadaya (The Gangster) is a 2018 Sri Lankan Sinhala action masala film directed by Siritunga Perera and co-produced by Chandrasena Palihena and Indika Wijeratne. It stars Udari Warnakulasooriya and Sriyantha Mendis in lead roles along with Darshan Dharmaraj and Kumara Thirimadura. Music composed by Suneth Kelum. It is the 1297th Sri Lankan film in the Sinhala cinema.

Plot

Cast
 Sriyantha Mendis as Desmond aka Porisadaya
 Udari Warnakulasooriya as Heli Wedisinghe
 Harsha Udakanda as Harsha
 Darshan Dharmaraj as Kalu Mahaththaya
 Kumara Thirimadura as Basnayake
 Udara Rathnayake as Vishwa Basnayake
 Kamal Deshapriya as Wedisinghe
 Amila Karunanayake as Desmond's son
 D.B. Gangodathenna as James
 Aishara Athukorala as Aisha
 Hashinika Karaliyadde as Desmond's wife
 Rajasinghe Loluwagoda as Chief monk
 Kapila Sigera
 Chamila Gamage as Aisha's Friend
 Imaya Liyanage as Sasmitha
 Kamal desapriya

References

External links
 

2018 films
2010s Sinhala-language films